Marco Hiller (born 20 February 1997) is a German professional footballer who plays as a goalkeeper for 1860 Munich.

Club career
Hiller began his youth career in 2003 at FC Grün-Weiß Gröbenzell, before moving to 1860 Munich's youth academy in 2008. He made his debut for the reserve side on 23 April 2018 against FV Illertissen in the Regionalliga Bayern, with the match a finishing as a 1–3 away loss. For the 2017–18 season, Hiller joined 1860's first team, which had been relegated to the Regionalliga. He made his debut on 13 July 2017 in a 4–1 home win against FC Memmingen. 1860 Munich finished as champions of the Regionalliga Bayern, and subsequently won the promotion play-offs to the 3. Liga against 1. FC Saarbrücken.

In the following season, Hiller made his professional debut in the first round of the 2018–19 DFB-Pokal against 2. Bundesliga side Holstein Kiel, which finished as a 1–3 home loss.

Honours
1860 Munich
 Regionalliga Bayern: 2017–18

References

External links
 
 

1997 births
Living people
German footballers
Association football goalkeepers
TSV 1860 Munich II players
TSV 1860 Munich players
3. Liga players
Regionalliga players